Victonara "Ara" Salas Galang (born January 4, 1995) is a multi-awarded, Filipina volleyball player. She was UAAP Rookie of the Year and Best Server during the Season 74 and UAAP Most Valuable Player in the Season 75. She is the former team captain (2014-2015) of the De La Salle University Lady Spikers.

Career
Galang was discovered by DLSU Lady Spikers head coach, Ramil de Jesus during one of her games at the Shakey's V-League girls division in 2009. She was a junior high school at Angeles University Foundation at that time. She played with AUF Great Danes from 2007 to 2011, being awarded Best Attacker in 2011 in the Shakey's Girls Volleyball League.

She have been awarded with the Sports Achievement Award and Class Valedictorian while in Holy Family Academy in elementary school, Athlete of the Year and Class Valedictorian in the Angeles University Foundation High School and Consistent Dean's Lister in De La Salle University. She also won the Best Server award playing for Palarong Pambansa in 2011.

In 2011, she joined the DLSU Lady Spikers to defend their championship title of the 74th season of UAAP women's volleyball tournament together with Cha Cruz, Michele Gumabao, and Aby Maraño. They were declared as the back-to-back champions and she also grabbed the Best Server award and was hailed as the Rookie of the Year. For the 2012 PVF Intercollegiate Volleyball Championship, she was awarded Best Attacker.

The following season, Galang was awarded Most Valuable Player, shared with Aby Maraño winning her third consecutive championship in the UAAP Season 75 tournament. For the season 76, the DLSU Lady Spikers lost to ADMU Lady Eagles ending their campaign finishing as league's first runner up. She was awarded Best Attacker during the 2014 Philippine National Games. She was chosen as the team captain in Season 77 for the Lady Spikers. She led her team to reach the number two spot on the league with a 10–2 win–loss record on the elimination round. She was also a top contender along with Alyssa Valdez for MVP title of the season. She tore her ACL and MCL ligaments and got a big bone bruise during their do-or-die stepladder match with National University on March 7, 2015. She failed to join her team at the Finals to face the Ateneo Lady Eagles for the fourth consecutive time. However, they were crowned as the first runner up of the league. In the same season, Galang, together with Kim Fajardo and Cyd Demecillo were hailed as first runner up in the beach volleyball tournament. She made her comeback in UAAP Season 78 as she together with her teammates defeated the Ateneo Lady Eagles winning the UAAP Season 78 women's volleyball tournament championship. This was also her last playing year in the UAAP.

Galang began her professional career in the Philippine Super Liga, where she was selected as the first overall draft pick for the 2016 season for the F2 Logistics Cargo Movers. She won the Second Best Outside Spiker individual award in the 2017 PSL All-Filipino Conference while playing with F2 Logistics.

Clubs
  F2 Logistics Cargo Movers (2016–present)

Awards

Individuals
 2011 Palarong Pambansa "Best Server"
 2011 Shakey's Girls Volleyball League "Best Attacker"
 2012 PVF Intercollegiate Volleyball Championship "Best Attacker"
 2014 POC-PSC Philippine National Games Women's Volleyball "Best Attacker"
 UAAP Season 74 "Rookie of the Year"
 UAAP Season 74 "Best Server"
 UAAP Season 75 "Most Valuable Player"
 2016 PSL All-Filipino "1st Best Outside Spiker"
 2017 PSL All-Filipino "2nd Best Outside Spiker"
 2018 PSL Invitational “Most Valuable Player”
 2019 PSL Grand Prix "1st Best Outside Spiker (local)"

Collegiate
 2012 PVF Intercollegiate Volleyball Championship -  Champions, with DLSU Lady Spikers
 2014 POC-PSC Philippine National Games Women's Volleyball -  Silver medal, with DLSU Lady Spikers
 UAAP Season 74 volleyball tournaments -  Champions, with DLSU Lady Spikers
 UAAP Season 75 volleyball tournaments -  Champions, with DLSU Lady Spikers
 UAAP Season 76 volleyball tournaments -  Silver medal, with DLSU Lady Spikers
 UAAP Season 77 volleyball tournaments -  Silver medal, with DLSU Lady Spikers
 UAAP Season 78 volleyball tournaments -  Champions, with DLSU Lady Spikers

Clubs
 2016 PSL All-Filipino -  Champions, with F2 Logistics Cargo Movers
 2016 PSL Grand Prix -  Bronze medal, with F2 Logistics Cargo Movers
 2017 PSL All-Filipino -  Silver medal, with F2 Logistics Cargo Movers
2017 PSL Grand Prix Conference -  Champions, with F2 Logistics Cargo Movers
2018 PSL Grand Prix Conference -  Silver medal, with F2 Logistics Cargo Movers
 2018 PSL Invitational -  Champions, with F2 Logistics Cargo Movers
2018 PSL All-Filipino Conference -  Silver medal, with F2 Logistics Cargo Movers
 2019 PSL Grand Prix -  Silver medal, with F2 Logistics Cargo Movers
2019 PSL All-Filipino Conference -  Champions, with F2 Logistics Cargo Movers

References

1995 births
Living people
University Athletic Association of the Philippines volleyball players
Sportspeople from Angeles City
De La Salle University alumni
Philippines women's international volleyball players
Filipino women's volleyball players
Volleyball players from Pampanga
Outside hitters
21st-century Filipino women